Aplao District is one of fourteen districts of the Castilla Province in Peru.

See also 
 Antamayu

References

Districts of the Castilla Province
Districts of the Arequipa Region